Sir Thomas Sewell  ( – 6 March 1784) was an English judge and Member of Parliament, and Master of the Rolls from 1764 to 1784.

He was the son of Thomas Sewell of West Ham, Essex. He is said to have been "bred up under an attorney". Sewell was a member of Middle Temple, called to the bar in 1734, and practised in the Chancery courts, where he was highly successful. He became a bencher of his inn and King's Counsel in 1754, and Treasurer of the Inn in 1765. By 1764, he was thought to be making between £3000 and £4000 a year from his practice, and was popular among religious dissenters as their champion in the courts.

Political career 

He stood for Parliament in 1754 at Wallingford and was defeated, despite spending more than £2000 (some from the Prime Minister's election fund) in the attempt, but was elected in 1758 as member for Harwich. Harwich was a "Treasury borough", where the government candidate was certain of success, but Sewell had his own interest in the town as well, since his father-in-law, Thomas Heath had been its MP earlier in the century.

However, he made little impact in the Commons and at the next election was not re-nominated at Harwich. He stood instead at Exeter, where he was heavily defeated despite Prime Minister Newcastle's support, though this time at his own expense rather than the government's. Nevertheless, later in the year, he was returned instead as the government candidate at Winchelsea.

In 1761, Sewell was one of two candidates considered for appointment as Solicitor General, but the post went instead to Fletcher Norton. However, in 1764 he was knighted and appointed Master of the Rolls, apparently to the surprise of many including himself, after a number of other candidates had refused the post; he held it until his death twenty years later. He earned a reputation as an able and efficient judge. He was also made a member of the Privy Council.

Family 

He married firstly Catherine Heath, daughter of Thomas Heath, MP for Harwich, by whom he had eight children, including Thomas Bailey Heath Sewell, his eldest son and heir, and Frances, who married  Matthew Lewis, the Deputy Secretary at War  by whom she was the mother of the writer Matthew  Lewis. She and her husband were later separated. He married secondly Mary Elizabeth Sibthorpe, daughter of Humphry Sibthorp, professor of botany at Oxford University and his first wife Sarah Waldo, by whom he had no surviving issue.

Thomas Bailey Heath Sewell married Lady Elizabeth Bermingham, eldest daughter and co-heiress of Thomas Bermingham, 1st Earl of Louth. Their son, also Thomas, made out a claim to the older Bermingham title Baron Athenry, but failed to establish his right, the House of Lords ruling, as they also did in another case, that the title could not descend in the female line.

References

1710 births
1784 deaths
British MPs 1754–1761
British MPs 1761–1768
Members of the Parliament of Great Britain for English constituencies
Masters of the Rolls